Levent Erdoğan (born 26 November 1958) is a Turkish weightlifter. He competed at the 1984 Summer Olympics and the 1988 Summer Olympics.

References

1958 births
Living people
Turkish male weightlifters
Olympic weightlifters of Turkey
Weightlifters at the 1984 Summer Olympics
Weightlifters at the 1988 Summer Olympics
Place of birth missing (living people)
20th-century Turkish people